Badino is a village in Boboshevo Municipality, Kyustendil Province, south-western Bulgaria.

References

Villages in Kyustendil Province